Chattambinaadu (English: The Rowdy Land) is a Malayalam-language action comedy film released in 2009. The film was directed by Shafi and written by Benny P. Nayarambalam. The film was made under Mammootty's production company Play House which distributed it as well. The film stars Mammootty, Siddique, Manoj K. Jayan, Suraj Venjaramoodu,Vinu Mohan and Raai Laxmi. The film's music was done by Alex Paul.

Chattambinadu was released on December 24, 2009, on 80 screens in Kerala. Despite getting mixed to negative reviews from critics the film was a commercial success. The character played by Suraj Venjarammoodu, Dasamoolam Damu, has over the years attained cult status and remains one of Suraj Venjaramoodu's most memorable roles.

Plot
The movie tells the story of a village called Chembattunadu in Palakkad district of Kerala, which is popular as Chattambinadu for the presence of several goons and hooligans. According to retired goons Chenkeeri Madhavan and Vadival Vasu, it was the severe animosity between Mallanchira and Kattappilly families that has caused the arrival of several goons to the land, including them, which made Chattambinadu notorious. The film begins with Mallanchira Chandramohan's plan to sell off his mansion, to pay up his heavy debts. But Kattappilly Nagendran, the present leader of Kattappilly faction, plays all ways to stop the sale. The local police inspector informs Chandramohan about Virendra Mallaya, a dreaded gangster, who also has strong passion in real estate. Chandramohan approaches Mallayya, who refuses to take up the mansion in the beginning. But upon the request from Dr. Lakshmi, his friend, who also hails from Chattambinadu, he decides to buy the property, inviting strong opposition from Nagendran. Mallayya, who speaks Malayalam with strong Kannada accent, arrives at Chattambinadu along with Murukan, his secretary, who is also more like his brother. At Chattambinadu, he comes across Vadival Vasu and his family consisting of daughters Gowri and Meenakshi. To create a rift among the villagers and Mallaya, under the instruction, Dashamoolam Damu, a foolish assistant of Nagendran, on one night steals the lorry of Mallayya and drives it into the house of Vasu, demolishing it. However Mallayya promises to repair the house with his own money. Murugan, who within this time had developed a soft feeling towards Meenakshi, takes them along with Maakri Gopalan to Mallayya's house. Dr. Lakshmi on her day of arrival at Chattambinadu on vacation learns from her brother that Nagendran has decided to marry her, without the approval of her parents. Shocked Lakshmi even witnesses Nagendran violently thrashing her fiancé, making him flee. Lakshmi explains her condition to Mallayya, who promises her all help. Gowri, who witnesses their conversation mistakes them of being in love. She gets jealous as she had within this time fell in love with him. Chandramohan, on a casual talk, tells Mallayya, about Veeru, his servant boy, who had once attacked his father Mallanchira Unnithan and ran away with all his hard earned money. Chandramohan also adds that his only aim in life is to find out Veeru and avenge him by killing him for the crime done to his father. Veerendra Mallaya, on hearing this story is really shocked as he is none other than Veeru, who had once ran away. Chandramohan, on understanding the relation between Meenakshi and Murugan, approaches Mallayya to get them married. Also Vasu wants Mallayya to marry Gowri, his elder daughter. One night Mallayya reveals his story to Vasu, whom he had assaulted with sword in a bid to escape years back. Unnithan had got Veeru, a Kannadiga street urchin, who understood not a single world in Malayalam. Unnithan and his family took care of him well and treated him as their own son. One day, in middle of a trip, Unnithan gets into an argument with Kattapilly Kuruppu, who tries to snatch the suitcase consisting of a huge amount of money. In an attempt to save Unnithan Veeru attacks Kuruppu and on the advice of Unnithan, runs away with the bag. But on hearing the cry of Unnithan, he comes back to see that Unnithan is severely wounded as attacked by Kattapilly Nagendran, son of Kuruppu. Kuruppu, then calls up people and tells them that it is Veeru who had killed Unithan, making him run for life. In an attempt to save himself, he assaults Vasu and jumps into river. The police inspector, who arrests him after a couple of days interrogates in Malayalam, and Veeru, who knows not a single word in Malayalam is confused, where by accepts his charges. But on realising that he is framed, he escapes from police. He also adds that it is Kattappilly Kuruppu, who is behind the crime. Mallaya is also shocked to find Unnithan at the house of Chandramohan, who is alive, but now paralysed, who also had lost the ability to speak after the incident.

Nagendran, at the meantime, has gone forward with his plan to marry Lakshmi, but is saved by Mallaya, who gets her married to her fiancé. Mallaya is shocked to see the old police inspector, who is now the father of the husband of Laksmi. He shows his willingness to help Mallayya to reveal the truth to Chandramohan, but is killed by Nagendran on the same night. The people of Chattambinadu, within this time recognises who Mallayya is and is waiting for his arrival to get him killed. Nagendran expands his net and gets the crowd to gather at the spot where Mallayya arrives. The rest of the story is how Mallayya succeeds in proving his innocence and has Nagendran killed by the public.

Cast

 Mammootty as Veerendra Mallayya 
 Siddique as Kattappilly Nagendran
 Manoj K. Jayan as Mallanchira Chandramohan
 Suraj Venjaramoodu as Dasamoolam Damu
 Vinu Mohan as Murugan
 Raai Laxmi as Gauri
 Meenakshi as Dr. Lakshmi
 Mythili as Meenakshi
 Salim Kumar as Maakri Gopalan
 Janardanan as Vadival Vasu
 Mohan Jose as Panickar
 Vijayaraghavan as Mallanchira Unnithan
 Sai Kumar as Rtd. DYSP Krishnadas
 Ambika Mohan as Murukan's Mother
 Spadikam George as CI Ayyappan, police officer
 Saju Kodiyan as Sugunan, police officer
 V. K. Sreeraman as himself
 Kalabhavan Navas 
 T. G. Ravi as Chenkeeri Madhavan
 Rony David as Rameshan, Lekshmi's Brother
 Boban Alummoodan as Santhosh, Lekshmi's Fiancee
 Balachandran Chullikadu as Kattappilly Cheriya Kuruppu
 Chembil Ashokan as Kannappan, a villager
 Narayanankutty as Paramu Pillai
 Anu Mohan as young Veeru
 Kalasala Babu as Kattapalli Kurup
 Shobha Mohan as Rukmini, Unnithan's wife and Mallayya's and Chandramohan's mother
 Besant Ravi
 Bindu Murali

Music
"Chattambinaadu" - Ramesh Babu, Reju Joseph, Vidhu Prathap
"Chenkadalikkumbilile" - Rimi Tomy
"Mukkuttichaanthaniyunne" - Manjari
"Mukkuttichaanthaniyunne [D]" - Manjari, Vidhu Prathap
"Oru Kadha Parayaam - C. J. Kuttappan

Reception

Critical Reception 
Chattambinadu received a rating of 2 out of 5 from the reviewers of Rediff as well as at NowRunning. IndiaGlitz criticised the movie's formulaic predictability.

Box office
Chattambinadu released on December 24, 2009, in 80 screens in Kerala. The film was box office success.

In Popular Culture
However despite its mixed to negative critical reception, the character Dashamoolam Damu played by Suraj Venjaramoodu has achieved a cult status and a huge fan following over the years, being one of Suraj's most well known roles. He has been subjected to a lot of memes since then and is among the one the most memorable and most favorite characters among Malayali moviegoers.

Spin Off 
In 2019, the director of the movie announced he will make a spin off of the movie featuring Dashamoolam Damu  as the main character. In an interview with Times Of India, director Shafi stated that trollers and netizens used to continuously bug him for a film that featured  Dashamoolam Damu as the main character.

References

External links 
 
 
 https://web.archive.org/web/20120407121357/http://popcorn.oneindia.in/title/4481/chattambinadu.html

2009 films
2000s Malayalam-language films
Films shot in Palakkad
Films shot in Karnataka
Films scored by Alex Paul
Films directed by Shafi